The World of Synnibarr (sometimes referred to simply as Synnibarr) was a multi-genre role-playing game published by Wonderworld Press and written by Raven c.s. McCracken. A second edition of the game, co-written by Bryce Thelin, was published in 1993. It is noted largely for its exceptionally poor design.

The game features an unusual amount of variety in play. It combines elements of fantasy, science fiction, superhero and other genres and does occasionally lend itself to power gaming.

A third edition of the game (tentatively known as Synnibarr Invicta) was funded by a Kickstarter in 2013, which was expected to be released in 2014–2015, but remains only partially complete as of June 2020.

Setting 
Synnibarr is set on Mars 50,000 years in the future, hollowed out and turned into a spaceship to take humanity to a safe place after Earth was destroyed. Civilization is beginning to be rebuilt after a series of disasters, and technology is practiced as a religion.

Synnibarr is also noted for bizarre monsters, including the Giant Mutant Fire Clam and the Flying Grizzly, the latter being capable of shooting laser beams from its eyes. Guilds and organizations play a major role in the Synnibarr "Worldship". Mortals are often able to interact with immortals, demi-gods and even the gods themselves.

System
Most rolls are of percentile dice (d100), though some are additive while others use a roll-under mechanic. The third edition game mechanic replaces the previous percentile system with a streamlined skill-based system, where resolve and experience create cogency levels that are pitted against opposing cogency levels for determining results.

McCracken and a group of other people have been playing and developing Synnibarr since the mid-'90s. In December 2012 a Kickstarter was launched to publish a new edition. The project was expected to span three books: an "Ultimate Adventurer's Guide", a "Worldship Atlas", and a "Book of Fate". The "Ultimate Adventurer's Guide" was published in August 2018, and as of March 2022 rewards have been fulfilled.

References

Fantasy role-playing games
Role-playing games introduced in 1991
Science fiction role-playing games
Science fantasy role-playing games